Irwin Samuel Bernstein (born 1933) is an American primatologist, sociobiologist, and professor of psychology. He is a distinguished research professor emeritus at the University of Georgia Franklin College of Arts and Sciences. He investigates the social organization of nonhuman primates with a focus on agonistic and reproductive behavior.

Early life and education
He received a B.A. in psychology from Cornell University in 1954 and a M.A. and Ph.D. in the same field from University of Chicago in 1955 and 1959, respectively. His graduate work focused on comparative and experimental psychology. In between 1955 and 1957, he was a lieutenant in the United States Air Force.

Career
Bernstein was an active primatologist for six decades. He was a research professor at the Yerkes National Primate Research Center, and served as Professor of Psychology and Zoology, University of Georgia at Athens. His research interests include primate social behavior and the relationship between endocrine activity in primates and activities such as stress, aggression and sex. In 2001, he received the Distinguished Primatologist award from the American Society of Primatologists; the award "honors a primatologist who has had an outstanding career and made significant contributions to the field."

Despite retiring in 2011, Bernstein continued teaching as Professor Emeritus at University of Georgia. He resigned on the second day of classes in August 2021 after one of his students refused to wear a face mask during the COVID-19 pandemic.

References 

Living people
1933 births
Place of birth missing (living people)
University of Georgia faculty
21st-century American psychologists
Primatologists
Sociobiologists
20th-century American biologists
21st-century American biologists
American mammalogists
Cornell University alumni
University of Chicago alumni
United States Air Force officers
20th-century American military personnel
20th-century American psychologists